Karan Singh may refer to:

Persons

 Karan Singh (1931-), Maharaja and Governor of Jammu and Kashmir, Leader of Indian National Congress
 Karan Singh II (1584 - 1628), Maharana of Mewar
 Karan Singh Grover, (1982-), Indian actor and model
 Karan Singh Tanwar,  Indian politician of Bharatiya Janata Party
 Karan Singh Thakral, Entrepreneur in Singapore and Executive Director of Thakral Group
 Karan Singh Yadav, (1945-), Indian politician of Indian National Congress
 Khem Karan Singh,  Lt General of Indian Army
 Karan Singh (Chhabra), Indian politician of Indian National Congress
 K. C. Singh Baba, Indian politician of Indian National Congress
 Karan Singh (Himachal Pradesh politician), Indian politician of Indian National Congress
 Karan Singh (Meerut), son of the Indian basketballer Shweatlana Singh